Libeliška Gora is a dispersed settlement in the hills south of Libeliče in the Municipality of Dravograd in the Carinthia region in northern Slovenia, right on the border with Austria.

References

External links
Libeliška Gora on Geopedia
Dom Ajda

Populated places in the Municipality of Dravograd